The pin-point method (or point-intercept method) is used for non-destructive measurements of plant cover and plant biomass. 

In a pin-point analysis, a frame (or a transect) with a fixed grid pattern is placed above the vegetation. A pin is inserted vertically through one of the grid points into the vegetation and will typically touch a number of plants. The number of times the pin touches different plant species is then recorded. This procedure is repeated at each grid point. Vertical rulers connected to the frame are used to prevent horizontal drift of the pins and to measure the height of vegetation hit by the pins.

References 

Habitat
Habitat management equipment and methods